Charles H. Seston (1840 – September 19, 1864) was a Union Army soldier killed in action during the American Civil War. He posthumously received the Medal of Honor for gallantry during the Battle of Opequon more commonly called the Third Battle of Winchester, Virginia on September 19, 1864.

Seston joined the army from Indiana in August 1861.

Medal of Honor citation
"The President of the United States of America, in the name of Congress, takes pride in presenting the Medal of Honor (Posthumously) to Sergeant Charles H. Seston, United States Army, for extraordinary heroism on 19 September 1864, while serving with Company I, 11th Indiana Infantry, in action at Winchester, Virginia, for gallant and meritorious service in carrying the regimental colors."

Sgt. Seston's body was returned to Indiana for burial. In addition to Seston, two other soldiers of the 11th Indiana Infantry received the Medal of Honor for this action. The others were Pvt. Peter J. Ryan and Pvt. John T. Sterling.

See also

List of Medal of Honor recipients
List of American Civil War Medal of Honor recipients: Q–S

References

External links
Military Times Hall of Valor
 Findagrave entry

1840 births
1864 deaths
People from New Albany, Indiana
People of Indiana in the American Civil War
Union Army soldiers
United States Army Medal of Honor recipients
American Civil War recipients of the Medal of Honor
Union military personnel killed in the American Civil War